The greater green snake or Chinese green snake (Ptyas major) is a snake of the family Colubridae.

Distribution
This species can be found in Central/South China (Hainan, Henan, Gansu, Anhui, Sichuan, Fujian, Guangdong, Guangxi, Guizhou, Hunan, Hubei, Jiangxi, Jiangsu, Shaanxi, Zhejiang) and Hong Kong, in Taiwan, North Vietnam, Laos and Bangladesh (Sylhet, Ratargul Swamp Forest).

Habits and habitat
This snake is diurnal and semi-arboreal, living in humid forests and farmland.  When encountered, they are mild-mannered and rarely bite.

Description
Ptyas major is a slender, medium-sized snake, averaging 75–90 cm (2½-3 feet) in total length, but occasionally growing to 120 cm (4 feet). Bright green above; ventral scales greenish-yellow. Dorsal scales smooth except that males have several mid-dorsal scale rows keeled. Some specimens have scattered black spots on dorsum. Dead specimens often turn bluish.

Diet
Earthworms, insect larvae, and other soft-bodied invertebrates.

Reproduction
Oviparous. Lays 2–16 eggs per clutch. Young snakes hatch in about two months.

References

Further reading
 Günther, A. 1858. Catalogue of Colubrine Snakes in the Collection of the British Museum. Trustees of the British Museum. (Taylor and Francis, Printers.) London. xvi + 281 pp. (Cyclophis major, p. 120.)
 Karsen, S. J., Lau, M.W.N, & Bogadek, A. (1998). Hong Kong Amphibians and Reptiles (2nd Edition). Provisional Urban Council Hong Kong. 

Colubrids
Snakes of Asia
Snakes of China
Reptiles of Hong Kong
Reptiles of Laos
Reptiles of Taiwan
Snakes of Vietnam
Reptiles described in 1858
Articles containing video clips
Taxa named by Albert Günther